Pseudochazara alpina is a species of butterfly in the family Nymphalidae. It is confined to the Caucasus in Dagestan.

Flight period 
The species is univoltine, being on wing from July to August.

Food plants
Larvae feed on grasses.

Subspecies
Pseudochazara alpina alpina
Pseudochazara alpina guriensis (Staudinger, 1878) Akhaltsikhe, Georgia
Pseudochazara alpina rjabovi (Sheljuzhko, 1935) Untsukul - Chirkata pass, Dagestan

References

External links
 Satyrinae of the Western Palearctic - Pseudochazara alpina

Pseudochazara
Butterflies described in 1878
Taxa named by Otto Staudinger